A survival suit, more accurately and currently referred to as an immersion suit, is a type of waterproof dry suit intended to protect the wearer from hypothermia if immersed in cold water or otherwise exposed after abandoning a vessel, especially in the open ocean.  Immersion suits usually have integral footwear, and a hood, and either built-in gloves or watertight wrist seals.
Suits manufactured by several manufacturers also include an inflatable pillow which is permanently attached high on the back, or an inflatable tube that is attached with zippers at two points on the chest, each side of the main zipper, and circles the back. When inflated, both of these devices provide enhanced stability to the wearer, which, if conscious, allows them to keep the head above water, and to keep wind and seas from striking the face. The inflation tube is routed from the inflatable pillow over the left shoulder of the user, and secured in a loop on the chest.

Some immersion suits are provided with straps and clips to allow multiple survivors to connect to one another in the water, to keep survivors together.

Some suits are manufactured with built-in hoisting lanyards, to allow easier retrieval from vessels with a higher freeboard that have hoisting capabilities.

The first record of a "survival suit" was in 1930 when a New York firm, American Life Suit Corporation, offered merchant and fishing firms what it called a safety suit for crews of ocean vessels. The suit came packed in a small box and was put on like a boilersuit.

The precursor of these suits was invented in 1872 by Clark S Merriman to rescue steamship passengers. It was made from rubber sheeting and became famous by the swim records of Paul Boyton. It was essentially a pair of rubber pants and shirt cinched tight at the waist with a steel band and strap. Within the suit were five air pockets the wearer could inflate by mouth through hoses. Similar to modern-day dry suits, the suit also kept its wearer dry. This essentially allowed him to float on his back, using a double-sided paddle to propel himself, feet-forward. Additionally, he could attach a small sail to save energy while slowly drifting to shore (because neither emergency radio transmitters nor rescue helicopters had been invented yet).

The first immersion suit to gain USCG approval was invented by Gunnar Guddal. Eventually the suit became accepted as essential safety gear.

Usage
Immersion suits are of two types: Work suits are worn for long periods in high risk environments, and survival suits are worn during emergencies.

Work suits
This type is worn for long periods while working in circumstances where the risk of exposure is considered to be high. They are made in a variety of standard sizes and chosen to fit the wearer. They are often worn by deep-sea fishermen who work in cold water fishing grounds.

Some of these garments resemble diving drysuits. Others may have many of the features of an immersion suit.

Since humans are warm blooded and sweat to cool themselves, suits that are worn all the time usually have some method for sweat to evaporate and the wearer to remain dry while working.
 Some aircrew dry suits are constructed of a breathable, fire-retardant material that allows water vapor to escape but prevents liquid from entering.
 Some aircraft pilot survival suits use a airtight material such as rubber-backed cotton, which is connected to a forced-air cooling system. Ventilation air is supplied via air hoses inside the cockpit. In an emergency, the hoses can be rapidly disconnected and the ventilation access ports closed on the suit.

Survival suits 
The first 'survival suits' in Europe were invented by Daniel Rigolet, captain of a French oil tanker. Others had experimented on similar suits abroad.

Unlike work suits, "quick don" immersion suits are not normally worn for work, but are stowed in an accessible location on board the craft. The operator may be required to have one immersion suit of the appropriate size on board for each crew member, and other passengers. If an immersion suit is not accessible both from a crew member's work station and berth, then two accessible suits must be provided.

This type of immersion suit's flotation and thermal protection is usually better than an immersion protection work suit, and if the suit is properly maintained, should extend in-water survival for a person who is trained in its use.

An adult immersion suit is often a large bulky one-size-fits-all design meant to fit a wide range of sizes. Two types of materials are used. Neoprene suits, without additional insulation, and suits constructed of a trilaminate waterproof material, with a snap-in insulating liner made from thin foam sheets cut and glued to form the suit, with a rayon backing to make donning the suit easier. These suits typically have oversize booties to accommodate various foot sizes. Gloves may be built into the suit, or be stored in easy access pouches at the end of the sleeves.  These suits have a waterproof zipper in front for access. The zippers must be properly maintained or the suit may not seal properly. There is generally a face flap to somewhat seal water out around the neck and protect the wearer from spray. Because of the oversized booties and large mittens, quick don immersion suits are often known as "Gumby suits", after the 1960s-era children's toy.

The integral gloves may be a thin waterproof non-insulated type to give the user greater dexterity during donning and evacuation, with a second insulating outer glove tethered to the sleeves to be worn while immersed.

A ship's captain (or master) may be required to hold drills periodically to ensure that everyone can quickly access the immersion suit storage in an emergency, and don the suit in the allotted amount of time. In the event of an emergency, it should be possible to put on an immersion suit in 60 seconds.

The Submarine Escape Immersion Equipment is a type of survival suit that can be used when escaping from a sunken submarine. The suit is donned before leaving the submarine and then inflated to act as a liferaft when the sailor reaches the surface.

Construction
Survival suits are normally made out of red, fluorescent orange, or yellow fire-retardant neoprene, for high visibility at sea. The neoprene material used is a synthetic rubber closed-cell foam, containing a multitude of tiny air bubbles making the suit sufficiently buoyant to also be a personal flotation device.

The seams of the neoprene suit are sewn and taped to seal out the water, and the suit has strips of SOLAS specified retroreflective tape on the arms, legs, and head to help the wearer to be located at night from a rescue aircraft or ship.

Open neck vs closed neck sealing 
The method of water sealing around the face can affect wearer comfort. Low-cost quick-donning suits typically have an open neck from chest to chin, closed by a waterproof zipper. However, the zipper is stiff and tightly compresses around the face resulting in an uncomfortable fit intended for short-duration use until the wearer can be rescued. The suit material is typically fairly stiff and the wearer is unable to look to the sides easily.

Suits intended for long-term worksuit use, or donned by rescue personnel, typically have a form-fitting neck-seal, with a hood that conforms to the shape of the chin. This design is both more comfortable and allows the wearer to easily turn their head and look up or down. The suit material is designed to be either loose or elastic enough to allow the wearer to pull the top of the suit up over their head and then down around their neck.

Safety features
Immersion suits can also be equipped with extra safety options such as:
 A whistle to permit the wearer to signal for help
 An emergency strobe light beacon
 Tethered mittens to better insulate the hands
 A personal locator beacon and automatic identification system man-overboard transponder
 Sea dye markers and floating streamers to increase visibility in water.

Inflatable survival suits
The inflatable survival suit is a special type of survival suit, recently developed, which is similar in construction to an inflatable boat, but shaped to wrap around the arms and legs of the wearer. This type of suit is much more compact than a neoprene survival suit, and very easy to put on when deflated since it is just welded from plastic sheeting to form an air bladder.

Once the inflatable survival suit has been put on and zipped shut, the wearer activates firing handles on compressed carbon dioxide cartridges, which punctures the cartridges and rapidly inflates the suit. This results in a highly buoyant, rigid shape that also offers very high thermal retention properties.

However, like an inflatable boat, the inflatable survival suit loses all protection properties if it is punctured and the gas leaks out. For this reason, the suit may consist of two or more bladders, so that if one fails, a backup air bladder is available.

Immersion suit maintenance
Each immersion suit needs to be regularly checked and maintained properly in order to be ready for use all the time. The maintenance of the immersion suits kept on board of the vessels must be done according to the rules of the International Maritime Organization (IMO). There are two Guidelines issued by IMOMSC/Circ.1047 and MSC/Circ.1114in relation to immersion suits' maintenance.

The first guideline gives instruction for monthly inspection and maintenance which must be done by the ship's crew. The second one specifies pressure testing which requires special equipment, and is usually done ashore by specialized companies, but can be done also on board the vessels if practical. Pressure testing must be performed every three years for immersion suits less than 12 years old counted from the suit's date of manufacture and every second year on older suits.

Images

References

External links

Clark S. Merriman's Patent of the first inflatable immersion suit from 1872.
http://www.washingtonpost.com/wp-dyn/content/article/2006/05/21/AR2006052101245.html Washington Post Story - Gunnar Guddel
http://www.viking-life.com/viking.nsf/public/products-immersionconstantwearsuits.html
https://www.machovec.com/ice_rescue/images/Survival%20-%20Front.JPG (big image, 1682 x 2190 pixels)
How to maintain immersion suits

Safety clothing
One-piece suits